Natalie Joy Robb (born 3 December 1974) is a Scottish actress and singer. She played the roles of Trish McDonald in the Scottish Television soap opera Take the High Road (1990–1999) and Jude Carlyle in the BBC soap opera Doctors (2001–2004). Since 2009, she has portrayed the role of Moira Barton in the ITV soap opera Emmerdale. Her other television roles include Dream Team (2000–2001) and The Bill (2004–2005).

Early life
Robb was born on 3 December 1974, as the youngest of three, she has an older sister and brother. As a child, Robb attended weekend drama groups in Glasgow, where she was discovered by director Alan Macmillan, later going to the Royal Scottish Academy of Music and Drama. Robb was also in a band called The Kinky People.

Career
Robb made her screen debut as a nine-year-old, starring in an STV docudrama alongside Tom Conti. At 13, she was awarded the BBC Young Entertainer of the Year award on kids' TV show, Going Live!. At the age of 14, she was cast in the role of Trish McDonald in the Scottish soap opera Take the High Road. She then appeared in the Sky One series Dream Team. Afterwards, she spent three years as Jude Carlyle in the BBC daytime soap opera Doctors. Years after her exit from Doctors, Robb admitted that she did not know how she coped on the series due to the medical terminology. She surprised herself when her brain "managed to take in all the information of the doctor jargon". However, she used her knowledge and experience from Doctors when she came into contact with a pregnant woman in labour who had collapsed and was bleeding. On the experience, Robb explained: "She was really panicking about losing the baby, obviously. For some reason, maybe because of Doctors, I was very calm." She left the series for a role as an undercover journalist posing as a police officer PC Andrea Dunbar in The Bill. Robb appeared in EastEnders in July 2006 as Gemma Clewes, the mistress of Max Branning (Jake Wood). In July 2008, she appeared in The Shepherd: Border Patrol with Jean-Claude Van Damme, where she played Ramona Garcia. In 2009, she played the part of a counsellor in the BBC school drama Waterloo Road. Later in 2009, it was announced that Robb had joined the cast of Emmerdale as part of a new farming family, the Bartons. Robb made her Emmerdale debut as Moira Barton on 17 July 2009.

Filmography

Awards and nominations

References

External links
 

1974 births
Actresses from Glasgow
Living people
People from Bellshill
Scottish television actresses
British television actresses
British soap opera actresses